Louis Carré (26 July 1663 – 17 April 1711) was a French mathematician and member of the French Academy of Sciences. He was the author of one of the first books on integral calculus. This level of activity led to him being brought on as an Associate Mechanician on 15 February 1702 and being promoted to Pensioner on 18 August 1706. This provided him with an income which allowed him to devote himself entirely to his academic studies during the final five years of his life. At age 46 he suffered an attack of dyspepsia from which he died in 1711.

References

Members of the French Academy of Sciences
1663 births
1711 deaths
People from Seine-et-Marne
17th-century French mathematicians
18th-century French mathematicians